Armand Richard (April 14, 1895 – March 30, 1982) was a Canadian politician. He served in the Legislative Assembly of New Brunswick as member of the Liberal party from 1944 to 1952.

References

1895 births
1982 deaths
New Brunswick Liberal Association MLAs